Bosara exortiva is a moth in the family Geometridae. It is found on Rook Island, Rossel Island and New Guinea.

References

Moths described in 1958
Eupitheciini